Modakurichi taluk is a taluk of Erode district of the Indian state of Tamil Nadu. Modakurichi became a separate taluk in Erode district by trifurcation of the erstwhile Erode taluk, along with Kodumudi taluk on 8 March 2016. The new taluk will have control over the same geographic entity of the Modakurichi revenue block with Modakurichi as the headquarters. It falls under the Erode revenue division.

Demographics
According to the 2011 census, the erstwhile Erode taluk had a population of 820,720 with 410,323 males and 410,397 females. There were 1,000 women for every 1,000 men. The taluk had a literacy rate of 73.5%. Child population in the age group below 6 years were composed of 35,016 males and 33,498 females. After trifurcation of the taluk, the newly created Modakurichi taluk will have a population of ~160,824.

Populated Towns and Villages
 Arachalur
 Avalpoondurai
 Nanjai Uthukuli
 Elumathur
 Lakkapuram
 Selvanagar

References

External links
 https://web.archive.org/web/20180330160655/http://www.erode.tn.nic.in/taluk.htm

Taluks of Erode district